, also known as , was a rensho of the Kamakura shogunate from 1287 to 1301.

References

1238 births
1323 deaths
Hōjō clan
People of Kamakura-period Japan